A statue of Fan Zhongyan is installed outside the Suzhou railway station in Suzhou, Jiangsu, China.

External links
 

Buildings and structures in Suzhou
Monuments and memorials in China
Outdoor sculptures in China
Sculptures of men in China
Statues of politicians
Statues of writers